Canadians in France are people born in Canada who emigrated to France, especially from French Canada. Those from the province of Québec are sometimes known as Québécois in France. There has also been a recent immigration of Acadians to France.

Demographics

Population size
The Canadian community in France is estimated at approximately 90,000 Canadians.

Notable people

See also
France–Canada relations
French Canadians

References

External links
  Le Portail des Québécois en France 
 Portal: Canadians living in OECD countries 
  

 
France
Ethnic groups in France